Fushih Pan (born 17 October 1957) is a Taiwanese plastic surgeon certified by the American Board of Plastic Surgery. Fushih Pan is also certified by the National Board of General Surgery of Taiwan and the Board of Plastic Surgery Specialist of the U.A.E.

Life 

Fushih Pan was born in Taipei, Taiwan the 17 of October 1957. He has a bachelor's degree in chemistry from the National Taiwan University in 1979, and a M.D. and Ph.D. in chemistry from the University of Chicago  through 1986-1989. He completed all of his doctoral qualifications in the United States where he resided as a plastic surgeon in many hospitals and as an instructor in the department of plastic surgery in the University of Pennsylvania.

Fushih Pan represented Taiwan as a team member for the Physicians for Peace organization and Northwest Medical to offer medical skills and advice in Developing Countries who were in the state of war like Estonia, Mexico, and Honduras from 1993 to 1994.

Fushih Pan returned to Taiwan in 1995. There he established a clinic where he currently performs plastic surgery. During the following the years  Fushih Pan has taken part in many research projects  along with the University of Chicago, University of Pennsylvania as well as the National Taiwan University.

His most recent research on stem cell tracking using mesoporous nanoparticles, binding of short chain peptides on to gold and silver nanoparticles as a platform of biomarkers, and modification of MSC differentiation using nanopeptides in the National Taiwan University, have led him to the development of the MIRA Procedure in 2009.

The MIRA Procedure is a multidisciplinary method for treating many chronic disease such as heart or liver failure. This procedure has also proved to be useful in the field of cosmetic surgery as it has spawned a successful alternative to a facelift known as the MIRA Lift.

References

External links 
 Bionet Esthetics

Living people
1957 births
Taiwanese medical researchers
Stem cell researchers
University of Chicago alumni
Taiwanese plastic surgeons
Writers from Taipei
National Taiwan University alumni
University of Pennsylvania faculty
Taiwanese educators
Science writers
20th-century Taiwanese educators
21st-century Taiwanese educators